Carly Marie Nelson (born February 11, 1998) is an American professional soccer player who plays as a goalkeeper for Orlando Pride of the National Women's Soccer League (NWSL).

Early life 
Born in Lindon, Utah, Nelson was a two-time First Team All-State goalkeeper as she helped Timpanogos High School reach the 4A state title game in three-straight seasons. She was also named Team MVP twice. She played club soccer with Celtic Storm, winning the state title in five seasons

Utah Utes 
Nelson played four seasons of college soccer at the University of Utah between 2016 and 2019 while studying for a bachelor's in positive psychology. As a freshman she made seven appearances, keeping three shutouts and conceding three goals. She made her first collegiate start in a 3–0 win over in-state rival Utah State on August 28, 2016. In 2018, she was twice named Pac-12 Conference goalkeeper of the week, led the conference in saves with 92 in total and ranked fourth in save percentage at 82.1%. In her final season, she made a career-high 105 saves, the most by a Ute in two decades and recorded Utah's longest shutout streak since the 2006 season after keeping four throughout September.

In summer 2019, Nelson also played for Utah Royals FC's semi-professional reserve team in the Women's Premier Soccer League. She was rostered for nine games and made one appearance, 45 minutes in a 1–0 defeat to Utah Arrows.

Club career

OL Reign 
Nelson declared for the 2020 NWSL College Draft but was not selected. She was invited to preseason training camp with Utah Royals FC as a non-roster invitee but the league shut down two days in to camp due to the COVID-19 pandemic. In June 2020, Nelson signed a short-term contract with OL Reign, one of four non-roster invitees signed for the 2020 NWSL Challenge Cup, the NWSL's replacement competition for a return to play following the three-month stoppage. She was an unused substitute in all five games. She was also an unused substitute in two Fall Series games.

Kansas City Current 
Nelson signed with the unbranded Kansas City NWSL expansion franchise on December 23, 2020. She made her senior club debut for the team on July 23, 2021, playing the full 90 minutes in a 0–0 draw with North Carolina Courage.

FC Nordsjælland 
In August 2021, Nelson was loaned to Danish Kvindeliga club FC Nordsjælland. She made her debut for the club on September 25, in a 3–1 win against AGF. She made 18 league appearances, keeping seven shutouts and conceding 15 goals as Nordsjælland finished 4th. She also made three appearances in the Danish Women's Cup. In July 2022, she joined the club permanently.

Orlando Pride 
On January 29, 2023, Nelson and Nordsjælland mutually agreed to terminate her contract so she could return to the United States, signing a two-year contract with Orlando Pride.

Personal life 
Nelson was raised in a Mormon community and speaks openly about her journey to freedom from the religion. She is openly gay and first came out at 13 to her best friend before being bullied at school as a result. With no support at home or school, Nelson felt isolated and attempted suicide. She is now an advocate for raising awareness to the struggles LGBTQ+ teens go through.

Career statistics

College summary

Club summary

References

External links 
 Carly Nelson at Utah Utes
 
 

Living people
1998 births
People from Lindon, Utah
Soccer players from Utah
American women's soccer players
Women's association football goalkeepers
Utah Utes women's soccer players
OL Reign players
Kansas City Current players
FC Nordsjælland (women) players
Orlando Pride players
National Women's Soccer League players
Elitedivisionen players
American expatriate women's soccer players
American expatriate sportspeople in Denmark
Expatriate women's footballers in Denmark
LGBT association football players
21st-century LGBT people